Daniel Torgersson is a Swedish professional ice hockey winger currently playing with the Manitoba Moose in the American Hockey League (AHL) as a prospect to the Winnipeg Jets of the National Hockey League (NHL).

Playing career
Torgersson made his Swedish Hockey League (SHL) debut with Frölunda HC during the 2019–20 season. Torgersson was drafted by the Winnipeg Jets in the second round of the 2020 NHL Entry Draft with the 40th overall pick.

On 10 April 2022, Torgersson was signed to a three-year, entry-level contract with draft club, the Winnipeg Jets. He immediately joined AHL affiliate, the Manitoba Moose for the remainder of the 2021–22 season.

Career statistics

Regular season and playoffs

International

References

External links

2002 births
Living people
AIK IF players
Frölunda HC players
Swedish expatriate ice hockey players in Canada
Manitoba Moose players
Swedish ice hockey forwards
Winnipeg Jets draft picks
People from Hönö
Sportspeople from Västra Götaland County